Arrie W. Davis (born July 21, 1940) is an American lawyer and jurist from Baltimore, Maryland. Until his retirement in July 2010, he was an associate judge on the Maryland Court of Special Appeals.

Background
Davis was born in Baltimore, Maryland, where he attended primary and secondary public schools, graduating from the Frederick Douglass Senior High School in 1959.  He earned a Bachelor of Arts degree from Morgan State College in 1963, Master of Arts from New York University in 1966 and his juris doctor from the University of Baltimore School of Law in 1969. Davis was admitted to Maryland Bar in 1969, the U.S. District Court for District of Maryland bar and the U.S. Court of Appeals for 4th Circuit in 1972 and U.S. Supreme Court bar in 1973. Davis is a  member, Maryland State, Baltimore City, Monumental City and J. Franklyn Bourne Bar Associations, he is the chairman of the Harry A. Cole Judicial Council.  During the 1970s, Davis taught law courses at Morgan State University (1971–81) and the Villa Julie College (1972–80).

Judicial career
On March 2, 1981, Davis was first appointed to the bench in Maryland: Associate Judge, District Court of Maryland for District 1 located in Baltimore City. Two years later he was elevated to the Baltimore City Circuit Court, 8th Judicial Circuit where he served as an associate judge for 7 years.  On December 27, 1990, he was named to Maryland's second highest court where he has served as a member of the Legislative Committee, 1989–91, Executive Committee, 1995–97, and the Civil Law and Procedure Committee, 1998-2001 of the Maryland Judicial Conference.

Awards
Legal Excellence Award, Waring Mitchell Law Society of Howard County, 1994.
Legacy for Excellence in Litigation Award, Snyder Center, University of Baltimore School of Law, 2003.
Legal Excellence Award, J. Franklyn Bourne Bar Association, 2004.
Alumnus of the Year, University of Baltimore School of Law, 2004.
Recognized as Distinguished Alumnus of Frederick Douglass Senior High School by Baltimore City Council, 2005.

Notes

1940 births
Living people
Morgan State University alumni
Maryland Court of Special Appeals judges